Agonopterix cnicella is a moth of the family Depressariidae. It is found in most of Europe, except Ireland, Fennoscandia, Portugal, the central part of the Balkan Peninsula, Latvia and Estonia. It has also been recorded from Morocco and Asia Minor.

The wingspan is 18–22 mm. Adults are on wing from June to  July.

The larvae feed on Eryngium species, including Eryngium maritimum and Eryngium campestre. They feed amongst spun leaves and shoots, often causing brown discolouration. Several larvae may be found together on the host plant. Larvae can be found from May to the beginning of June.

References

External links
lepiforum.de

Moths described in 1832
Agonopterix
Moths of Europe
Moths of Africa
Moths of Asia